Ernald (or Ærnald) (died 1163) was the second Abbot of Kelso before becoming Bishop of Cell Rígmonaid (St Andrews), the highest ranking Scottish see in the period. He was elected to the see on Sunday, St. Brice's Day (13 November) 1160, and was consecrated at Dunfermline in the presence of King Máel Coluim IV the following Sunday by William, Bishop of Moray, the Papal legate. He is alleged by John Fordun to have founded the "Great Church" of St. Andrews. His short episcopate ended when he died, according to Andrew of Wyntoun, in 1163. He was buried in the church of St Regulus (Riagail).

References
Dowden, John, The Bishops of Scotland, ed. J. Maitland Thomson, (Glasgow, 1912), p. 7

12th-century births
Year of birth unknown
1163 deaths
Bishops of St Andrews
12th-century Scottish Roman Catholic bishops